Gloucester Rural LLG is a local-level government (LLG) of West New Britain Province, Papua New Guinea.

Wards
01. Aumo
02. Aisega
03. Somate
04. Kilenge
05. Airagilpua
06. Gakiu
07. Alaido
08. Gurrissi

References

Local-level governments of West New Britain Province